KOKX (1310 AM) is a commercial radio station serving the Keokuk, Iowa area. The station primarily broadcasts a talk and sports format.  KOKX is owned by Leah Jones and Michael Greenwald, Keokuk Broadcasting Inc. operating as Radio Keokuk.

During daytime broadcasts, the station uses a single tower with essentially an omnidirectional pattern.  During the nighttime, KOKX reduces power and switches to an antenna system that uses three towers arranged in a directional array that concentrates the signal toward the northwest, with a smaller lobe to the southeast.

History
KOKX began broadcasting October 19, 1947, as a 250-watt daytime only station. The licensee was Keokuk Broadcasting Company, and the station was affiliated with the Iowa Tall Corn Network.

On June 27, 2016, KOKX changed their format from adult standards to country. The station was then reformatted to local news, talk and sports upon the 2018 ownership change.

References

External links

OKX (AM)
Radio stations established in 1947
1947 establishments in Iowa